The Arab Federation for Digital Economy (AFDE) is an Arab organization affiliated with the Arab League that aims to support the development that is related to the fields and uses of the digital economy in the Arab World.

The Arab Federation for Digital Economy was established in April 2018 by the Council of Arab Economic Unity, and it joined the Arab League’s specialized federations in 2021, and the membership of the Executive Office in 2021, to work under the direct supervision of the Secretary-General of the Arab League.

References 

2018 establishments in the United Arab Emirates
Organizations established in 2018
Arab League
Economy of the Arab League